Akbarabad (also Romanized as Akbarābād) is a village in Tang-e Narak Rural District, in the Central District of Khonj County, Fars Province, Iran. At the 2006 census, its population was 90, in 18 families.

References 

Populated places in Khonj County